Exeter services is a motorway service station on the M5 motorway in Devon, England. It is situated at junction 30 of the motorway, east of the city of Exeter, and is accessed from both directions of the motorway.

The service station opened in 1977 and is owned and operated by Moto Hospitality. It is the southernmost motorway service station in the United Kingdom.

References

External links 
Moto Official Site – Exeter
Motorway Services Online – Exeter
Motorway Services Info – Exeter 

1977 establishments in England
M5 motorway service stations
Moto motorway service stations
Transport in Devon
Buildings and structures in Exeter